Phospholipase B, also known as lysophospholipase, is an enzyme with a combination of both PLA1 and PLA2 activities; that is, it can cleave acyl chains from both the sn-1 and sn-2 positions of a phospholipid. In general, it acts on lysolecithin (which is formed by the action of PLA2 on lecithin).

See also
 Phospholipase

References